Fischteich is a lake in the Nordwestmecklenburg district in Mecklenburg-Vorpommern, Germany. At an elevation of 6.8 m, its surface area is 0.266 km².

Lakes of Mecklenburg-Western Pomerania
Ponds of Mecklenburg-Western Pomerania